Contrast is the first studio album by the French electronic producer and DJ Matt Fax, released by Enhanced Music on 6 October 2017. The album contains the singles "Aura Lusia", "Amnesiac" and "Close 2 U" (with Mike Schmid).

Background
Matt started working on this album for four years, stating it's been a project he always wanted to do. In 2016, Enhanced Music approached him to release an album, which he accepted. He told IHouseU that some tracks been written several years ago but were reworked to fit his nowadays sound.

The first single, "Aura Lusia", was released as part of an EP and was included on the album after the Pete Tong support on BBC Radio 1. During the summer, Matt released "Amnesiac" and "Close 2 U" as singles to announce the album. "Close 2 U" has been rated 8.0/10 by DJ Mag, stating it was "far outclassing anything similar we've heard from deadmau5 in at least a decade".

On 17 October, Matt made a 20-minute guest mix and interview with Armin van Buuren in his radio show A State of Trance. A week before, Above & Beyond invited him for a 30-minute guest mix on Group Therapy and later support "Synopia". Several tracks from Contrast been included in officials Spotify playlists, leading to having some tracks having over 700,000 listens on the platform.

Track listing

References

2017 albums
Trance albums